Matchett is a surname. Notable people with the surname include:

Kari Matchett (born 1970), Canadian actress in television and film
Steve Matchett (born 1962), commentator for American cable TV station SPEED Channel
Stuart Matchett, Australian radio announcer and program director
Thomas Matchett (1826–1900), Ontario businessman and political figure
Charles H. Matchett (1843-1919), American socialist politician
Matchett Herring Coe (1907–1999), American sculptor active in Texas